Mwansabombwe District is a district of Luapula Province, Zambia. It was separated from Kawambwa District in 2012.

References 

Districts of Luapula Province